The following people played for the Bears for at least one game in the 1926 AFL regular season, the only one of the team’s (and the league’s) existence:

1 Position later known as quarterback
2 Also played tackle
3 Played fullback and tailback
4 Also played end
5 After the Newark Bears folded, for the Boston Bulldogs for rest of 1926 season
6 Also played center
7 Played fullback and blocking back

References

Newark Bears (AFL) players
Newark Bears (AFL)